Manduca aztecus is a moth of the  family Sphingidae. It is known from Mexico.

References

Manduca
Moths described in 1942